Ironwill is an American Christian hardcore band, and they primarily play hardcore punk and melodic hardcore. They come from Augusta, Georgia. The band started making music, in 2009. Their first extended play, Unturned, was released in 2011 by Blood and Ink Records.

Background
Ironwill is a Christian hardcore band from Augusta, Georgia.

Music history
The band commenced as a musical entity in 2009, with their release, Unturned, an extended play, that was released by Blood and Ink Records, on March 29, 2011.

Discography
EPs
 Unturned (March 29, 2011, Blood & Ink)
Hour of the Wolf Demo (2009)

References

External links
Official website

Musical groups from Georgia (U.S. state)
2009 establishments in Georgia (U.S. state)
Musical groups established in 2009
Blood and Ink Records artists